Harald Oehme (born 3 September 1953) is a German speed skater. He competed in two events at the 1976 Winter Olympics.

References

External links
 

1953 births
Living people
German male speed skaters
Olympic speed skaters of East Germany
Speed skaters at the 1976 Winter Olympics
People from Zschopau
Sportspeople from Saxony
20th-century German people